Padala Glacier, Sentinel Range
 Padesh Ridge, Oscar II Coast
 Padpadak Island, Wilhelm Archipelago
 Paisiy Peak, Livingston Island 
 Pakusha Cove, Smith Island 
 Palakariya Cove, Liège Island 
 Palilula Glacier, Brabant Island
 Pamidovo Nunatak, Oscar II Coast 
 Panagyurishte Nunatak, Greenwich Island  
 Panega Glacier, Livingston Island  
 Panicheri Gap, Sentinel Range  
 Papazov Island, Astrolabe Island
 Papazov Passage, Biscoe Islands
 Papiya Nunatak, Nordenskjöld Coast  
 Paprat Peak, Brabant Island
 Paramun Buttress, Nordenskjöld Coast 
 Parangalitsa Peak, Sentinel Range 
 Parchevich Ridge, Greenwich Island  
 Paril Saddle, Livingston Island  
 Parlichev Ridge, Oscar II Coast
 Paroriya Buttress, Alexander Island
 Parvomay Neck, Greenwich Island  
 Pasarel Island, Aitcho Islands  
 Pascin Point, Livingston Island
 Pashuk Glacier, Smith Island
 Paspal Glacier, Oscar II Coast 
 Passy Peak, Livingston Island  
 Pastra Glacier, Trinity Island  
 Pastrogor Peak, Sentinel Range
 Pate Island, Wilhelm Archipelago
 Patleyna Glacier, Sentinel Range 
 Patmos Peak, Bastien Range 
 Patresh Rock, Robert Island
 Pautalia Glacier, Livingston Island  
 Pavlikeni Point, Greenwich Island 
 Pazardzhik Point, Snow Island
 Pegas Island, Wilhelm Archipelago
 Pelikan Island, Trinity Island  
 Pelishat Point, Greenwich Island
 Peperuda Island, Wilhelm Archipelago  
 Perelik Point, Robert Island 
 Peristera Peak, Sentinel Range 
 Perivol Rock, Snow Island
 Perkos Dome, Danco Coast
 Pernik Peninsula, Loubet Coast  
 Perperek Knoll, Livingston Island 
 Mount Persenk, Nordenskjöld Coast 
 Perunika Glacier, Livingston Island  
 Peshev Ridge, Livingston Island  
 Peshtera Glacier, Livingston Island  
 Pesyakov Hill, Livingston Island  
 Peter Peak, Livingston Island  
 Petko Voyvoda Peak, Livingston Island 
 Petkov Nunatak, Trinity Peninsula
 Petleshkov Hill, Astrolabe Island
 Petrelik Island, Anvers Island  
 Petrich Peak, Livingston Island  
 Petroff Point, Brabant Island
 Petrov Ridge, Danco Coast  
 Petvar Heights, Sentinel Range 
 Peychinov Crag, Oscar II Coast 
 Peyna Glacier, Graham Coast
 Phanagoria Island, Zed Islands  
 Pimpirev Beach, Livingston Island 
 Pimpirev Glacier, Livingston Island
 Pindarev Island, Rugged Island
 Pingvin Rocks, Snow Island
 Piperkov Point, Elephant Island 
 Pipkov Glacier, Alexander Island 
 Pirdop Gate, Livingston Island  
 Pirgos Peak, Oscar II Coast
 Pirin Glacier, Davis Coast  
 Pirne Peak, Oscar II Coast
 Pirogov Glacier, Brabant Island
 Pisanitsa Island, Greenwich Island 
 Pishtachev Peak, Danco Coast
 Pistiros Lake, Livingston Island
 Piyanets Ridge, Alexander Island 
 Pizos Bay, Nordenskjöld Coast
 Plakuder Point, Pickwick Island
 Plana Peak, Livingston Island  
 Plas Point, Graham Coast 
 Platno Lake, Nelson Island
 Pleven Saddle, Livingston Island
 Pleystor Glacier, Liège Island  
 Pliska Ridge, Livingston Island  
 Ploski Cove, Tower Island  
 Plovdiv Peak, Livingston Island
 Podayva Glacier, Brabant Island
 Podem Peak, Brabant Island
 Podgore Saddle, Sentinel Range  
 Podgumer Col, Trinity Peninsula  
 Poduene Glacier, Danco Coast  
 Podvis Col, Davis Coast  
 Pogledets Island, Livingston Island
 Poibrene Heights, Oscar II Coast
 Polezhan Point, Liège Island
 Polich Island, Astrolabe Island
 Pomorie Point, Livingston Island 
 Ponor Saddle, Sentinel Range
 Mount Pontida, Alexander Island 
 Mount Popov, Foyn Coast
 Popovo Saddle, Smith Island  
 Pordim Islands, Robert Island  
 Porlier Bay, Livingston Island  
 Povien Bluff, Trinity Peninsula  
 Predel Point, Anvers Island 
 Preker Point, Trinity Island 
 Prelez Gap, Trinity Peninsula  
 Presian Ridge, Livingston Island  
 Preslav Crag, Livingston Island  
 Presnakov Island, Low Island
 Prespa Glacier, Livingston Island
 Prestoy Point, Graham Coast  
 Priboy Rocks, Robert Island  
 Prilep Knoll, Trinity Peninsula  
 Príncipe de Asturias Peak, Vinson Massif  
 Pripek Point, Graham Coast 
 Pripor Nunatak, Alexander Island 
 Prisad Island, Low Island
 Prisoe Cove, Livingston Island  
 Probuda Ridge, Sentinel Range
 Progled Saddle, Sentinel Range
 Prosechen Island, Livingston Island  
 Prosenik Peak, Sentinel Range  
 Proteus Lake, Greenwich Island
 Provadiya Hook, Greenwich Island  
 Pulpudeva Glacier, Sentinel Range
 Purmerul Peak, Loubet Coast

See also 
 Bulgarian toponyms in Antarctica

External links 
 Bulgarian Antarctic Gazetteer
 SCAR Composite Gazetteer of Antarctica
 Antarctic Digital Database (ADD). Scale 1:250000 topographic map of Antarctica with place-name search.
 L. Ivanov. Bulgarian toponymic presence in Antarctica. Polar Week at the National Museum of Natural History in Sofia, 2–6 December 2019

Bibliography 
 J. Stewart. Antarctica: An Encyclopedia. Jefferson, N.C. and London: McFarland, 2011. 1771 pp.  
 L. Ivanov. Bulgarian Names in Antarctica. Sofia: Manfred Wörner Foundation, 2021. Second edition. 539 pp.  (in Bulgarian)
 G. Bakardzhieva. Bulgarian toponyms in Antarctica. Paisiy Hilendarski University of Plovdiv: Research Papers. Vol. 56, Book 1, Part A, 2018 – Languages and Literature, pp. 104-119 (in Bulgarian)
 L. Ivanov and N. Ivanova. Bulgarian names. In: The World of Antarctica. Generis Publishing, 2022. pp. 114-115. 

Antarctica
 
Bulgarian toponyms in Antarctica
Names of places in Antarctica